Cheltzie Lee (born 21 April 1993) is an Australian former competitive figure skater. She is the 2010 national champion and represented Australia at the 2010 Winter Olympics in Vancouver. She also competed at seven ISU Championships, achieving her best result, tenth, at the 2011 Four Continents.

Personal life 
Cheltzie Lee was born 21 April 1993 in Campbelltown, New South Wales. Her African American mother, Renita, is from Louisiana, and her Chinese father was born in Bangladesh. She practiced gymnastics from age six to twelve. She was left with a permanent spinal defect after a car accident in 2007.

Lee attended Mt Carmel Catholic High School. She then decided to pursue a Bachelor of Inclusive/Primary Education and Disability Studies. In 2017, she married Australian freestyle skier and 2014 Winter Olympian Sam Hall.

Career 
Lee began learning to skate as a five-year-old, at Canterbury Ice Rink. She debuted on the ISU Junior Grand Prix series in 2007 and placed 23rd at the 2008 World Championships.

Lee began the 2009–2010 season at the 2009 Nebelhorn Trophy, competing to earn a spot for Australia in the ladies' event at the 2010 Winter Olympics. She finished as the first alternate. After Israel decided not to send Tamar Katz, Lee was named to the Australian Olympic team. At the 2010 Vancouver Winter Olympics, she placed 18th in the short program with a score of 52.16 points (a personal best) to qualify for the free skate. She finished 20th overall at the Olympics and 17th at the 2010 World Championships. Kylie Fennell, Gloria Pracey, and Andrei Filippov coached her at the Sydney Figure Skating Club.

During the 2010–2011 season, Lee placed tenth at the 2011 Four Continents Championships and 21st at the 2011 World Championships.

Lee decided to take a year off to concentrate on her university studies and to "live a little". She returned to competition in June 2012, winning the Hollins Trophy at her home rink of Canterbury and the 2012 WinterSun in Boondall, Queensland.

Lee hoped to qualify for the 2014 Winter Olympics but injuries hindered her training in later years; she tore her posterior cruciate ligament and was also diagnosed with osteitis pubis.

Programs

Competitive highlights 
JGP: Junior Grand Prix

References

External links 

 

1993 births
Living people
Australian female single skaters
Sportswomen from New South Wales
Australian people of Chinese descent
Australian people of African-American descent
Olympic figure skaters of Australia
Figure skaters at the 2010 Winter Olympics
People educated at Sydney Distance Education High School
Figure skaters from Sydney